Eugene H. Hasenfus (born January 22, 1941) is a former United States Marine who helped fly weapons shipments on behalf of the U.S. government to the right wing rebel Contras in Nicaragua. The sole survivor after his plane was shot down by the Nicaraguan government in 1986, he was sentenced to 30 years in prison for terrorism and other charges, but pardoned and released the same year. The statements of admission he made to the Sandinista government resulted in a controversy in the U.S. government, after the Reagan administration denied any connection to him.

Personal life
Eugene Hasenfus was born on January 22, 1941. In 1986, he lived in Marinette, Wisconsin. The U.S. army described him as having joined the Marine Corps in May 1960 and having spent five years in the corps before receiving an honorable discharge. At the time of his capture, he was married to Sally Hasenfus. He had a brother named William.

Contra scandal

Capture

On October 5, 1986, Hasenfus was aboard a Fairchild C-123 cargo plane, N4410F, when it was shot down over Nicaragua by the Sandinista government with a Soviet SA-7 surface-to-air missile. The plane had been flying weapons to the anti-Sandinista Contra rebels, including 50,000 rifle cartridges for the Soviet-made AK-47, 60 collapsible AK-47s, nearly as many RPG-7's, and 150 pairs of jungle boots. Three members of the flight crew were killed: Hasenfus was the only survivor. The two pilots and a Nicaraguan radio operator died in the crash. Hasenfus had been wearing a parachute, unusual for Central Intelligence Agency (CIA) operatives at the time. Hasenfus managed to dive out of the open cargo hatch of the plane after it was hit by the Nicaraguan missile; he was later captured while sleeping in a makeshift hammock made from his parachute.

CIA links

After he was captured by the Nicaraguan government, he stated at a press conference that he had previously dropped supplies to CIA agents in Southeast Asia, and that flights into Nicaragua were directly supervised by the CIA. His statement also included his recruitment by a friend in the CIA, an operation based in Ilopango airbase in El Salvador, supported by U.S. army colonel James Steele. The CIA and the U.S. government of Ronald Reagan denied any connection with the flight, though they said they supported any civilian effort to support the Contras. U.S. Secretary of State George Shultz stated that the plane had been paid for by private operators, and that none of the men on it had any connection to the U.S. government. Hasenfus later repudiated his statement, saying that he was unaware if his fellow workers were employed by the CIA, and that he had only heard rumors to that effect. The men in question, Max Gomez and Ramon Medina, were Cuban Americans. The CIA had at the time been legally forbidden by the U.S. Congress from helping the Contras. Gomez and Medina had been identified as people who had helped organize covert arms supplies to the Contras. Soon after his capture he said that the two men were friends of then-vice-President of the U.S. George H. W. Bush, but later retracted this statement as well, saying he was not sure. Hasenfus was charged with "terrorism, conspiracy and disturbing public security". Hasenfus stated that he was sure, however, that the operation to supply the Contras with weapons, named Enterprise, was ultimately supervised by the U.S. government. The capture of Hasenfus provided direct evidence of a link between the Contras, and the U.S. government and the Reagan White house; documents found on the dead men linked them to Oliver North.

Sentencing and controversy
Hasenfus was tried in Nicaragua, and on November 15, 1986, sentenced to 30 years in prison for terrorism and other charges. His wife Sally made a plea to Nicaraguan president Daniel Ortega for clemency. Nicaraguan defense minister Humberto Ortega stated later that the sentence was not directed at Hasenfus himself, but toward the "irrational, unjust policy" of the U.S. government. On December 17, 1986, Hasenfus was pardoned and released by the Nicaraguan government, at the request of U.S. Senator Christopher Dodd. Hasenfus subsequently unsuccessfully sued US Air Force officer Richard Secord (involved with organizing weapons shipments to the Contras), Albert Hakim, Southern Air Transport and Corporate Air Services over issues relating to his capture and trial. The controversy over the flight led U.S. House of Representatives Speaker Thomas P. O'Neill to launch an investigation into the flight. The U.S. press generally believed that there was more to the story of Hasenfus than the Reagan administration had admitted; according to scholar Scott Armstrong, this had the effect of making them more skeptical of the U.S. government's initial denial of the weapons-for-hostages deal during the Iran-Contra affair.

Afterwards 
Hasenfus continued living in Wisconsin afterwards. In the 2000s he was repeatedly arrested for indecent exposure. After violating the terms of his probation by exposing himself in a Wal-Mart parking lot in Marinette in 2005, he was imprisoned for several months at the Green Bay Correctional Institution. He was released on the 19th anniversary of his release by Nicaragua.

References

1941 births
Living people
American people imprisoned abroad
American people convicted of spying for the United States
Iran–Contra affair
People from Florida
People from Marinette, Wisconsin
Recipients of Nicaraguan presidential pardons
People of the Nicaraguan Revolution
United States Marines